Peng Shuai was the defending champion, but chose not to participate.

Carol Zhao won the title, defeating Liu Fangzhou in the final, 7–5, 6–2.

Seeds

Draw

Finals

Top half

Bottom half

References
Main Draw

Shenzhen Longhua Open - Singles